The Château du Grand-Saint-Jean is a listed chateau in Puyricard, Bouches-du-Rhône, France.

Location
It is located in Puyricard, a former village now part of the city of Aix-en-Provence, in Provence. It is located 30 kilometers away from the centre of Aix. It can be accessed via the Chemin du Grand-Saint-Jean.

History
The construction of the first chateau and the chapel began in the eleventh century. In 1564, King Charles IX of France (1550-1574), Catherine de' Medici (1519-1589) and Henry IV of France (1553-1610) visited the chateau.

The current chateau was built from 1583 to 1591 by Antoine Laurens and Esprit Boyer. In 1622, King Louis XIII of France (1601-1643) visited the chateau. Four decades later, in 1660, King Louis XIV of France (1638-1715) was also a guest.

In 1933, Blanche d'Estienne de Saint-Jean, the heiress to the estate, donated the chateau and its grounds to the city of Aix-en-Provence.

Since the 1990s, an outdoors theatre has been one of the venues of the Aix-en-Provence Festival. In 2013, Portuguese composer Vasco Mendonça created an opera based at the Château du Grand-Saint-Jean. It is called, The House Taken Over''.

Heritage significance
It has been listed as a "monument historique" since November 3, 1975.

References

Grand
Houses completed in 1591
Monuments historiques of Bouches-du-Rhône